Viktor Yanukovych may refer to:

 Viktor Yanukovych (born 1950), former president and prime minister of Ukraine
 Viktor Viktorovych Yanukovych (1981–2015), his son and member of parliament in Ukraine